The commune of Mishiha is a commune of Cankuzo Province in north-eastern Burundi. The capital is in Mishiha.

References

Communes of Burundi
Cankuzo Province